Duncan's Peak, at  above sea level, is the ninth-highest peak in the Pioneer Mountains of the U.S. state of Idaho. The peak is located on the border of Sawtooth and Salmon-Challis National Forests as well as Blaine and Custer counties.

References 

Mountains of Idaho
Mountains of Blaine County, Idaho
Mountains of Custer County, Idaho
Salmon-Challis National Forest
Sawtooth National Forest